Connor Wood is the name of:

Connor Wood (basketball) (born 1993), Canadian basketball player
Connor Wood (footballer) (born 1996), English footballer
Connor Wood (sprinter) (born 1998), British sprinter and champion at the 2019 British Indoor Athletics Championships